Silvano Aureoles Conejo (born 23 August 1965) is a Mexican politician affiliated with the Party of the Democratic Revolution (PRD) and former governor of Michoacán.

Career
An agricultural engineer and has a Master in Science in Forestry for Regional Rural Development from the Chapingo Autonomous University, Aureoles Conejo has been Executive Commissioner and State Executive Coordinator (UNORCA), participating in discussion forums MOCAF network representation, member of the General Coordination of Permanent Agrarian Congress (1997) Agricultural and Forestry Front Worthy's Budget for Field (1997-1999)

Aureoles Conejo was a Federal Deputy in the LVIII Legislature, President of the Rural Development Commission, a member of the Committees on Forestry, Agriculture, Ecology and Environment in the Chamber of Deputies. He was mayor of Zitácuaro, President of the Coordinating Municipalista of Michoacán (2002-2003) and Secretary General of the Association of Local Authorities of Mexico AC (AALMAC). In his native Michoacán, he served as Secretary of Agricultural Development, was also President of the Mexican Association of Secretaries of Rural Development, AC. He was Senator in the LX and LXI Legislature, Chairman of the Committee on Water Resources, Secretary of Agrarian Reform Commission, Secretary of the Committee on Foreign Relations, North America, was a member of the Committees on Agriculture and Livestock, and the Commission of Government and Justice.

In 2012, he was the Deputy Coordinator of the Parliamentary Group of the Party of the Democratic Revolution in the Senate. He was a gubernatorial candidate for the PRD to the Government of Michoacán in 2011. In 2012, he assumed the Vice Presidency of the Board of the Senate. In 2012 he was elected federal deputy for the District 03 of Zitacuaro, Michoacán. He was the Coordinator of the Parliamentary Faction of the PRD in the Chamber of Deputies for the legislature LXIILXII Legislature

In 2015, Aureoles Conejo ran for governor of Michoacán; he won with a plurality of 36.17% of the votes. On October 1, he assumed office and was sworn as governor.

Personal life
On 10 September 2020, Aureoles Conejo tweeted that he had tested positive for COVID-19.

Controversies

Destitution Request
In 2019, via social networks, citizens requested the auditing and destitution of Silvano Aureoles, using platform change.org and reaching 50 thousand signatures, 24 thousand of which were collected in less than four days.

Fernando Padilla
On 13 April 2021, during his visit to Aguililla, he went out of his truck to harass and push Fernando Padilla, a teacher who was protesting among several other people, against the government due to the cartel violence in the region. Silvano was accompanied by bodyguards and military personnel. On 20 April, Fernando Padilla's whereabouts where unknown, as he had to relocate himself for security reasons.

References

1965 births
Living people
Party of the Democratic Revolution politicians
Members of the Chamber of Deputies (Mexico)
Presidents of the Chamber of Deputies (Mexico)
Members of the Senate of the Republic (Mexico)
Politicians from Michoacán
21st-century Mexican politicians
Governors of Michoacán
Chapingo Autonomous University alumni